Oussama Methazem (born December 16, 1993) is an Algerian goalkeeper who currently plays for the Algerian Ligue Professionnelle 1 Club CA Bordj Bou Arréridj.

National team
Methazem participated in the 2016 Summer Olympics in Rio de Janeiro with the Algeria national under-23 football team. He played in the third match against the Portugal Olympic football team, which ended in a 1–1 draw.

References

1993 births
Living people
Algerian footballers
Olympic footballers of Algeria
Footballers at the 2016 Summer Olympics
Association football goalkeepers
21st-century Algerian people